Tan Sri Datuk Amar Teuku Zakaria bin Teuku Nyak Puteh (later Ramlee bin Puteh) (22 March 1929 – 29 May 1973), better known by his stage name P. Ramlee (Puteh Ramlee), was a Malayan actor, filmmaker, musician, and composer famous in both modern-day Singapore, Malaysia, Indonesia and Southern Thailand. Born in the Straits Settlements, he is regarded as a prominent icon of Malay language entertainment.

His contributions to the film and music industry as well as his literaly work began when he made his acting debut in Singapore for Malay Film Productions in 1948. He reached the height of his career there throughout the 1950s before declining in the 1960s when he moved to Kuala Lumpur to work for Merdeka Film Productions. Although acclaimed for his career in Singapore, Ramlee was denounced in Malaysia during his life, with his career only facing retrospective resurgence there decades after his death.

Early life
Ramlee was born on 22 March 1929 to Teuku Nyak Puteh Bin Teuku Karim (1902–1955) and Che Mah Binti Hussein (1904–1967). His father, Teuku Nyak Puteh, who was a descendant of a wealthy family in Aceh, migrated from Lhokseumawe in Aceh, Indonesia, to settle in Penang, where he married Ramlee’s mother, who hailed from Kubang Buaya, Butterworth.

Ramlee received his education from the Sekolah Melayu Kampung Jawa (Kampung Jawa Malay School), Francis Light English School and then to Penang Free School; in all he was registered as "Ramlee" by his father, because his name Teuku Zakaria was not suitable with other children at that time. Reportedly a reluctant and naughty student, Ramlee was nevertheless talented and interested in music and football. His studies at the Penang Free School were interrupted by the Japanese occupation from 1942 to 1945, during which he enrolled in the Japanese navy school (Kaigun Gakko). He also learnt the basics of music and to sing Japanese songs during this period with his teacher, Hirahe-san. When the war ended, he took music lessons that enabled him to read musical notations.

Name 
He abbreviated his name to P. Ramlee (Puteh Ramlee), taking inspiration from the Tamil patronymic naming conventions, where the initial stood for his father's name (Puteh) and was followed by his given name (Ramlee).

Career

By 1948, the 19 year-old Ramlee had already won a number of singing competitions, and was writing his own songs and playing the violin in a kroncong band. That year, B. S. Rajhans, a film director for the Malay Film Productions (MFP) came across P. Ramlee at a singing competition hosted by Radio Malaya in Bukit Mertajam, Penang. Rajhans placed Ramlee in a supporting role in his film Chinta ("Love"), in which he played a villain, and he also performed five songs as a playback singer providing vocals for the lead actor .

In Bakti, he was the first actor to sing in his own voice instead of relying on playback singer. In the following films, such as Juwita in 1951 and Ibu ("Mother") in 1953, he became established as a major star of the Malay film industry. Between 1948 and 1955, he starred in a total of 27 films.

Aside from acting, Ramlee was a prolific songwriter, and around 500 of his songs have been recorded, either by himself or by other artists. Ramlee himself recorded 359 songs for his films and records. Among his best known songs are "", "", "Engkau Laksana Bulan", "", "Tudung Periok", "" and "Azizah". The songs Ramlee wrote were featured in his films, performed by Ramlee himself or by other artists.

Ramlee wrote the screenplay for the film based on a story by Lu Xun. He also directed and starred in  the Bujang Lapok comedy series. One of these, Pendekar Bujang Lapok, won the Best Comedy award at the Asia-Pacific Film Festival. He also won the Best Actor award for Anak-ku Sazali at the festival. Other significant films he directed for MFP include Antara Dua Darjat, Ibu Mertua-ku and Tiga Abdul.

Ramlee's career at the Malay Film Productions in Singapore between 1955 and 1964 was considered his "golden age" when he made his most critically acclaimed films and wrote his best-remembered songs. In 1964, he left Singapore for Kuala Lumpur to make films with Merdeka Film Productions, however, he was less successful there and faced constant sabotage from other Malaysian artists. 

He made 18 films with Merdeka, and his last film was Laksamana Do Re Mi. His last song was "Ayer Mata di Kuala Lumpur" ("Tears in Kuala Lumpur") intended for a film of the same name before he died in 1973. In all, Ramlee starred in 62 films and directed 33. When Laksamana Do Re Mi was nominated at the 1973 Asia Pacific Film Festival, Ramlee was ignored by other Malaysian artists in attendance, and he subsequently decided to sit with Singaporean artists instead, with foreign artists (from Hong Kong and Japan) giving him more recognition as well.

Death and legacy

Before dawn of 29 May 1973, P. Ramlee died at the age of 44 from a heart attack and was buried at Jalan Ampang Muslim Cemetery, in Kuala Lumpur.

At the time of his death, Ramlee's career was generally ignored by the Malaysian entertainment industry, and had largely been denounced out of jealousy from other Malaysian artists. It was only during the late 1980s, two decades after his death, that his contributions became much more honoured.

In the late 1980s, the P. Ramlee Memorial or Pustaka Peringatan P. Ramlee was built in his home in Setapak, Kuala Lumpur. In 1992, the street Jalan Parry, in the center of Kuala Lumpur, was renamed Jalan P. Ramlee in his honour. In 1990, he was posthumously awarded the Malaysian honorific title Tan Sri, and then in 2009, the honorific title of "Datuk Amar" by Sarawak State Government. Then Chief Minister of Sarawak, Abdul Taib Mahmud, an avid fan of  Ramlee, presented the award to his adopted daughter, Dian P. Ramlee, in a ceremony honouring veteran artists in Kuching.

The P. Ramlee House is a museum situated along Jalan P. Ramlee (formerly Caunter Hall road) in Penang, Malaysia. The building is a restored wooden house that was originally built in 1926 by his father and uncle. The house had previously undergone multiple repairs before being taken over by the National Archives as an extension of its P. Ramlee Memorial project in Kuala Lumpur. Items on display at the house include personal memorabilia related to his life in Penang and items belonging to his family.

On 22 March 2017; his 88th birthday, Google honored P. Ramlee with a Doodle on the Malaysian Google homepage.

In 2021, Kentucky Fried Chicken (KFC) honoured him with their limited-time menu, the Burger P. Ramlee — a combination between KFC Zinger and P. Ramlee's favourite dish, the Nasi Kandar where it is available in four combos — À'la Carte, Kombo, Set Legenda and Kombo Ikon.

Filmography

P. Ramlee was involved in many aspects of his films: as scriptwriter, director, actor as well as music composer and singer. He was involved in 62 films throughout his career as an actor, as well as a number of other films in other capacities.

Awards
 :
 Member of the Order of the Defender of the Realm (AMN) (1962)
 Commander of the Order of Loyalty to the Crown of Malaysia (PSM) – Tan Sri (1990; posthumously)
P. Ramlee was posthumously granted the sobriquet Seniman Agung.
 :
 Knight Commander of the Order of the Star of Hornbill Sarawak (DA) – Datuk Amar (2009; posthumously)

Entities named after P. Ramlee

Various places are named after Ramlee
 Jalan P. Ramlee, Penang (formerly known as Caunter Hall; renamed on 30 August 1983)
 Jalan P. Ramlee, Kuala Lumpur (formerly known as Jalan Parry; renamed in 1982)
 Bangunan P. Ramlee and Bilik Mesyuarat Tan Sri P. Ramlee at Sekolah Kebangsaan Hulu Klang, Selangor (used as background in Masam Masam Manis)
 Jalan P. Ramlee, Kuching, Sarawak (formerly known as Jalan Jawa)
 Taman P. Ramlee (formerly Taman Furlong) a townships at Setapak, Kuala Lumpur and George Town, Penang
 Pawagam Mini P. Ramlee at Studio Merdeka, FINAS, Ulu Klang, Selangor
 Makmal P.Ramlee at Filem Negara Malaysia, Petaling Jaya, Selangor
 P. Ramlee Auditorium (formerly known as RTM Auditorium), Angkasapuri
 SK Tan Sri P. Ramlee, Georgetown, Penang (formerly SK Kampung Jawa, his alma mater; renamed on 13 November 2011)
 Ramlee Mall at Suria KLCC shopping centre, Kuala Lumpur
 Bukit Nanas Monorail station, Kuala Lumpur, formerly known as P. Ramlee Monorail station
 Auditorium P. Ramlee, RTM Kuching, Sarawak

References

External links

 P.Ramlee's Profile, sinemamalaysia.com.my (Malay language)
 P. Ramlee Cyber Museum
 P. Ramlee: Namamu Dijulang, Jasamu Dikenang Astro special tribute Program, October 2010
 

Malaysian people of Acehnese descent
Malaysian people of Malay descent
1929 births
1973 deaths
Malaysian male film actors
Malaysian film directors
Malaysian musicians
Malaysian film score composers
Malaysian singer-songwriters
Malaysian film producers
Singaporean people of Malay descent
Singaporean male film actors
Singaporean male television actors
Singaporean film directors
Singaporean musicians
Singaporean singer-songwriters
Singaporean television personalities
20th-century Singaporean male actors
20th-century Singaporean male singers
Singaporean composers
Singaporean film producers
Acehnese people
People from Penang
Members of the Order of the Defender of the Realm
Commanders of the Order of Loyalty to the Crown of Malaysia
Knights Commander of the Order of the Star of Hornbill Sarawak
20th-century Malaysian male actors
Malay-language film directors
Malay Film Productions contract players
Merdeka Film Productions contract players
Male film score composers